Quincy Regional Airport  (Baldwin Field) is a city-owned airport 12 miles east of Quincy, a city in Adams County, Illinois, United States. It is used for general aviation but also sees Southern Airways Express flights to Chicago's O'Hare International Airport and St. Louis Lambert International Airport, a service which is subsidized by the federal government's Essential Air Service program at a cost of $1,956,856 (per year).

The National Plan of Integrated Airport Systems for 2021–2025 categorized it as a non-primary commercial service airport.

The first airline flights were on Mid-Continent in 1947; successor Braniff left in 1959. TWA arrived in 1948 and left in 1953-54; Ozark arrived in 1950 and left in 1982.

It is the least busy of the 12 commercial airports in Illinois.

Quincy has a solar panel project that is expected to be operational by the end of 2022.

The airport has often played host to events held by the International Stinson Club, including fly-ins, job fairs, and more.

Facilities
The airport covers 1,101 acres (446 ha) at an elevation of 769 feet (234 m). It has three runways: 4/22 is 7,098 by 150 feet (2,163 x 46 m) and made of asphalt/concrete; 18/36 is 5,400 by 150 feet (1,646 x 46 m) and made of asphalt/concrete; 13/31 is 5,397 by 150 feet (1,645 x 46 m) and made of asphalt.

For the twelve month period ending January 1, 2019, the airport had 19,444 aircraft operations, an average of 53 per day: 80% general aviation, 20% air taxi and less than 1% military. In July 2021, there were 54 aircraft based at this airport: 33 single-engine, 13 jet, 7 multi-engine, and 1 ultra-light. 

This airport does not have a control tower and operates as a non-towered airport.

In celebration of the 2018 Illinois Bicentennial, Quincy Regional Airport was selected as one of the Illinois 200 Great Places by the American Institute of Architects Illinois component (AIA Illinois).

Airline and destinations

Passenger

On November 6, 2006, Mesa Airlines announced that new non-stop service to Chicago Midway International Airport and Kirksville Regional Airport would begin in February 2007, operated by subsidiary Air Midwest. Nine months after starting the service, Mesa announced they would drop Quincy on November 9, 2007. The airport was formerly served by Trans World Express and Great Lakes Airlines.

As of November 2022, Quincy is served by Cape Air through the Essential Air Service program. Cape Air requested they be released from their contract to serve Quincy earlier in the year due to pilot staffing issues, and Southern Airways Express was chosen to replace them starting December 1, 2022.

Incidents
On November 19, 1996, United Express Flight 5925 from Chicago via Burlington, Iowa, crashed on landing at Quincy. A Beechcraft King Air was attempting to takeoff on an intersecting runway while the United Express Beechcraft 1900 landed; the aircraft collided at the runway intersection. All 12 on the B1900 and two on the King Air were killed.

References

Other sources

 Essential Air Service documents (Docket OST-2003-14492) from the U.S. Department of Transportation:
 Order 2005-1-17: selecting Trans States Airlines, Inc., d/b/a American Connection, to provide essential air service at Decatur, Illinois, for a new two-year period beginning April 1, 2005, at a subsidy rate of $954,404 annually, and selecting Corporate Airlines, Inc., d/b/a American Connection, to provide essential air service at Quincy, Illinois, for a new two-year period beginning August 1, 2005, at a subsidy rate of $1,097,406 annually.
 Order 2007-3-10: selecting Great Lakes Aviation, Ltd., to provide essential air service at Quincy, Illinois, for a two-year period at subsidies of $1,532,891 for the first year and $1,421,614 for the second year.
 Order 2009-10-13: selecting Hyannis Air Service, Inc. d/b/a Cape Air, to provide subsidized essential air service (EAS) at Marion/Herrin, Quincy, and Cape Girardeau, for a two-year period beginning when Cape Air inaugurates full EAS at each of the three communities and ending at the close of the 24th month thereafter, at a combined annual subsidy rate of $5,469,768 ($2,053,783 for Marion/Herrin, $1,946,270 for Quincy, and $1,469,715 for Cape Girardeau). The Department is selecting Multi-Aero, Inc. d/b/a Air Choice One to provide subsidized EAS at Decatur, Illinois, and Burlington, Iowa, for a two-year period beginning when it inaugurates full EAS and ending at the close of the 24th month thereafter, at a combined annual subsidy of $5,253,644 ($3,082,403 for Decatur and $2,171,241 for Burlington). The Department is selecting Great Lakes Aviation, Ltd. to provide subsidized EAS at Fort Leonard Wood, Missouri, for the two-year period from November 1, 2009, through October 31, 2011, at an annual subsidy of $1,292,906.
 Order 2011-4-12: re-selecting Hyannis Air Service, Inc. d/b/a Cape Air, to provide essential air service (EAS) at Marion/Herrin, Illinois (Marion) and Quincy, Illinois/Hannibal, Missouri (Quincy), and Cape Girardeau/Sikeston, Missouri (Cape Girardeau), for the four-year period from December 1, 2011, through November 30, 2015, for a combined annual subsidy rate of $5,689,438 ($2,104,616 for Marion, $1,956,856 for Quincy, and $1,627,966 for Cape Girardeau). Marion and Quincy will receive 36 weekly round trips and Cape Girardeau will receive 24 weekly round trips. All service will operate nonstop to/from Lambert-St. Louis International Airport (St. Louis) using eight- or nine-passenger Cessna 402 aircraft.

External links
 Airport page at City of Quincy website
 Aerial photo as of April 1998 from USGS The National Map
 

Illinois Great Places - Quincy Regional Airport
Society of Architectural Historians SAH ARCHIPEDIA entry on Quincy Regional Airport

Airports in Illinois
Essential Air Service
Quincy–Hannibal area
Transportation buildings and structures in Adams County, Illinois